SOCET SET is a software application that performs functions related to  photogrammetry. It is developed and published by BAE Systems. SOCET SET was among the first commercial digital photogrammetry software programs.  Prior to the development of digital solutions, photogrammetry programs were primarily analog or custom systems built for government agencies.

Features
SOCET SET inputs digital aerial photographs, taken in stereo (binocular) fashion, and from those photos it automatically generates a digital elevation model, digital feature (vector data), and orthorectified images (called orthophotos).  The output data is used by customers to create digital maps, and for mission planning and targeting purposes.

The source images can come from film-based cameras, or digital cameras.  The cameras can be mounted in an airplane, or on a satellite.  A key requirement of the imagery is that there must be two or more overlapping images, taken from different vantage points.  This "binocular" characteristic is what makes it mathematically possible to extract the 3-dimensional terrain and feature data from the imagery.

A key step, involving very complex least squares mathematics, is triangulation which determines exactly where the cameras were positioned when the photographs were taken.  Photogrammetrists that contributed to SOCET SET's Triangulation include Scott Miller, Bingcai Zhang, John Dolloff, and Fidel Paderes.  If the quality of the triangulation is poor, all subsequent data will have correspondingly poor positional accuracy.
 
The most recent major version, released in 2011, is version 5.6.

Stereo display
SOCET SET, like all high-end photogrammetry applications, requires a stereo display to be used to its fullest potential.  Although SOCET SET can run and generate all its products on a computer with only a conventional display, a typical user will require a stereo display to view the digital data overlaid on the imagery.  Interactive (manual) quality assurance requires this capability.

File formats
SOCET SET has the ability to read and write the following formats:  VITec, Sun Raster, TIFF, TIFF 6.0 (Raster, Tiled, Tiled JPEG, and LZW), JFIF, NITF 2.0, NITF 2.0 JPEG, NITF 2.1, NITF 2.1 JPEG, ERDAS IMAGINE, JPEG 2000, Targa, COT, DGN, USGS DOQ, MrSID, Plain Raster.

SOCET SET has the ability to read terrain data formats, including: DTED, USGS DEM, ASCII (user-defined), LIDAR LAS, ArcGrid, SDTS, NED, GSI, GeoTIFF.

Vector formats supported include: DXF, Shapefile, ASCII (ArcGen), ASCII, TOPSCENE.

Applications
SOCET SET, like some photogrammetry tools, is used for the following applications:
Cartography (map making) – especially topographic maps
Targeting (warfare)
Mission planning
Mission rehearsal
Remote sensing
Building a 3D model of the Earth's surface for computer simulation
Astrophysics
Conservation-restoration

About half of SOCET SET users are commercial, and half are government/military.

History
Development started as a Research and Development project around 1989, with Jim Gambale as the sole developer.  At the time, the parent corporation was GDE Systems (formerly a subsidiary of General Dynamics).  The hardware platform was a PC running Interactive Unix.

After the prototype proved successful, a larger R&D effort was initiated in 1990, led by Herman Kading.  One of the primary accomplishments of this effort was to migrate the product to UNIX Platforms, including Sun, SGI, HP, and IBM.

Technical knowledge was provided by Helava Inc, a company based in Detroit, Michigan that specialized in photogrammetry.  Helava employees Scott Miller, Janis Thiede, and Kurt Devenecia brought in-depth experience in the field.

Leadership of the project passed to Neal Olander around 1992, and after this time, SOCET SET (which before then was only sold to government customers) began to be distributed commercially.  Around 1996, SOCET SET was migrated to the Microsoft Windows operating system, although the Unix system continued to be supported as well.

Technical skills were provided by Tom Dawson, Kurt Reindel, Dave Mayes, Jim Colgate, Bingcai Zhang and Dave Miller.

Future 
Starting in 2008, SOCET SET photogrammetric functionality is migrating to the next generation product, SOCET GXP (Geospatial eXploitation Product).

Meaning of SOCET SET 
SOCET SET is an acronym that stands for SOftCopy Exploitation Toolkit.  The phrase is a play on the actual tool socket set.

Release history
v1.0 – 1991
v2.0 – 1993
v3.0 – 1995
v4.0 – June 1997
v4.1 – Sept 1998
v4.2 – July 1999
v4.3 – Sept 2000
v4.4 – Dec  2001
v5.0 – Sept 2003
v5.1 – Apr  2004
v5.2 – Nov  2004
v5.3 – June 2006
v5.4 – Summer 2007
v5.4.1 – Jan 2008
v5.5 – Jun 2009
v5.6 – Jun 2011

Alternatives
The chief competitor to SOCET SET is the Leica Photogrammetry Suite (aka LPS, owned by ERDAS), INPHO, PHOTOMOD and Intergraph, which are also leaders in the field of photogrammetry.

Other related applications that have some photogrammetry functionality include ArcGIS, ENVI, and ERDAS IMAGINE, all of which are primarily GIS or remote sensing applications.

See also
Photogrammetry
Triangulation
Orthophoto
Binocular vision
Reconnaissance
Remote Sensing
Imaging Spectroscopy
Least squares

Related terms
Image Processing
GIS
Topography
Multispectral

References

External links
Paper on terrain extraction
Official page

Photogrammetry software
BAE Systems